Giovanni D'Alise (14 January 1948 – 4 October 2020) was an Italian Roman Catholic bishop.

Biography
D'Alise was born in Naples, Italy and received his licentiate from the Pontifical Theological Faculty of Southern Italy. He was ordained to the priesthood in 1972. He served as bishop of the Roman Catholic Diocese of Ariano Irpino-Lacedonia, Italy, from 2004 to 2014 and as bishop of the Roman Catholic Diocese of Caserta, Italy, from 2014 until his death in Caserta from COVID-19 during the COVID-19 pandemic in Italy.

Notes

External links

1948 births
2020 deaths
21st-century Italian Roman Catholic bishops
Deaths from the COVID-19 pandemic in Campania
Clergy from Naples
20th-century Italian Roman Catholic priests